Baseball at the 1971 Pan American Games was contested between teams representing Canada, Colombia, Cuba, Dominican Republic, Mexico, Nicaragua, Puerto Rico, United States, and Venezuela. The 1971 edition was the sixth Pan American Games, and was hosted by Cali.

Medal summary

Medal table

Medalists

References

 

1971
1971 Pan American Games
Pan American Games
1971 Pan American Games